Sibiricine is a bioactive isoquinoline alkaloid isolated from Corydalis crispa (Fumariaceae), which is a Bhutanese medicinal plant from the Himalayas.

Using high resolution mass spectrometry, the molecular formula of sibiricine is determined to be C20H17NO6. The IUPAC name for sibiricine is 8'-hydroxy-6-methylspiro[7,8-dihydro-[1,3]dioxolo[4,5-g]isoquinoline-5,7'-8H-cyclopenta[g][1,3]benzodioxole]-6'-one. The proton nuclear magnetic resonance (PMR) spectrum of sibiricine at 100 MHz shows that sibiricine is structurally related to ochrobirine and ochotensine. With the exception of sibiricine, 8 other alkaloids are extracted by investigating Corydalis crispa. These isoquinoline alkaloids are protopine, 13-oxoprotopine, 13-oxocryptopine, stylopine, coreximine, rheagenine, ochrobirine, and bicuculline.

References

Alkaloids found in Papaveraceae
Heterocyclic compounds with 3 rings
Nitrogen heterocycles
Oxygen heterocycles
Spiro compounds